“Alright, Okay, You Win” is a jazz standard written by Sid Wyche (music) and Mayme Watts (lyrics). It was first recorded in 1955 by several artists including Ella Johnson, The Modernaires, Bill Farrell, and Count Basie, but failed to chart nationally. Peggy Lee's 1958 recording (Capitol 45-19202) reached number 68 on the Billboard Hot 100 list.  It has since become a jazz standard which has been recorded by numerous artists.

References

1958 singles
1955 songs
Peggy Lee songs
Songs written by Sid Wyche